Leslie Richard "Arliss" Howard (born October 18, 1954) is an American actor, screenwriter, and film director. He is known for his roles in the films Full Metal Jacket (1987), Tequila Sunrise (1988), The Lost World: Jurassic Park (1997), The Time Traveler's Wife (2009), Moneyball (2011), and Mank (2020).

Early life and education

Howard was born in Independence, Missouri. He has a sister, Joy Howard, and two younger brothers, Jim and Kip. He graduated from Truman High School and Columbia College.

Career
Howard established his career with roles in the films Full Metal Jacket, Men Don't Leave, Ruby, and Natural Born Killers. He was nominated for two CableACE Awards for his roles in the television films Somebody Has to Shoot the Picture and The Man Who Captured Eichmann, winning for the former.

In 1997, he portrayed billionaire John Hammond's evil nephew Peter Ludlow in the film The Lost World: Jurassic Park and U.S. Vice President John C. Calhoun in the film Amistad.

Howard has had a recurring role in the CBS weekly drama series Medium and has directed several episodes. He also starred in and directed the films Big Bad Love and Dawn Anna, both co-written with James Howard, his brother. His wife, Debra Winger, starred in both films. In 2010 he played Kale Ingram, a benignly duplicitous supervisor at an American intelligence agency, in the TV series Rubicon, which was canceled by AMC after 13 episodes. Howard appeared in the 2011 feature Moneyball.

Howard has extensive stage credits, including a role in the 2009 revival of August Wilson's Joe Turner's Come and Gone on Broadway. He has appeared in several productions at the American Repertory Theatre (ART) in Cambridge, Massachusetts, including Paula Vogel's How I Learned to Drive, with Winger, and Bertolt Brecht's In the Jungle of the Cities, directed by Robert Woodruff. He was also seen as Mikhail Lvovich Astrov in Anton Chekhov's Uncle Vanya, and Nikolai Ivanov in Chekhov's Ivanov, with Winger playing the role of Anna.

Howard joined the cast of a CBS political drama pilot titled Ways & Means with Patrick Dempsey in June 2020.

Personal life
Howard is married to actress Debra Winger. He has two sons, Sam Howard (born 1987) from his previous marriage to talent agent Karen Sellars, and Gideon "Babe" Howard (born 1997) with Winger.

Filmography

Film

Television

References

External links
 
 

1954 births
20th-century American male actors
21st-century American male actors
American male film actors
American male television actors
Columbia College (Missouri) alumni
Living people
Male actors from Missouri
Writers from Independence, Missouri